Corder is a surname. Notable people with the surname include:

 Dan Corder, South African radio host
 Esther Corder, Dutch cricketer
Frank Eugene Corder American who crashed his Cessna on the lawn of the White House
Frederick Corder, English composer
 Ian Corder, British former Royal Navy officer
James Watson Corder, English historian
 Jason Corder, American producer
 John Shewell Corder, architect
 Paul Corder, English composer
 Philip Corder, British archaeologist
 Rosa Corder, Victorian artist in London
 Sharon Corder, American producer in Canada
 Tim Corder, American politician
William Corder, hanged 1828, English murderer